Wing Lung Wai is a walled village located in the Kam Tin area of Yuen Long District, in Hong Kong. Three other walled villages, Kat Hing Wai, Tai Hong Wai, and Kam Hing Wai are located nearby and were built around the same time.

Administration
Wing Lung Wai is a recognized village under the New Territories Small House Policy.

History
The village was founded by Tang Siu-kui and his clansmen in the Chenghua reign (1465-1487) of the Ming dynasty. The village was earlier called Sha Lan Mei or Wing Lung Wai. The name was changed into the present name in 1905.

The enclosing wall was built in the Kangxi reign (1661-1722) of the Qing dynasty to safeguard the village from bandits, privates and other enemies. The entrance gate, originally located at the front wall of the village, on its  central axis, was later relocated to the south due to feng shui reasons, after establishment of the nearby the walled village Tai Hong Wai. The moat was reclaimed in the 1960s.

Features
In the Chung Shing Temple, the village shrine, eleven deities are worshiped, including Kwun Yam, Hung Shing and Che Kung.

Kang Sam Tong was built in Wing Lung Wai in the 1880s. It is an ancestral hall, and it also served as a study hall until 1926.

Although the former watchtowers no longer exist, the northeast watchtower has some base structure left.

Conservation
The entrance gate of Wing Lung Wai is a Grade II historic building. The Chung Shing Temple and the Kang Sam Tong are both Grade III historic buildings.

Transportation 
Kowloon Motor Bus (KMB)

 54     Yuen Long (West) Bus Terminus - Sheung Tsuen (Circular)
 64K   Yuen Long (West) Bus Terminus - Tai Po Market Railway Station
 77K   Yuen Long (Fung Cheung Road) Bus Terminus - Sheung Shui Bus Terminus
 251B   Pat Heung Road Bus Terminus - Sheung Tsuen (Circular)

Green Minibus (GMB)

 602   Yuen Long (Fung Cheung Road) - Tai Kong Po

MTR

 Kam Sheung Road

References

External links

 Delineation of area of existing village Wing Lung Wai (Kam Tin) for election of resident representative (2019 to 2022)
 Pictures by the Antiquities Advisory Board: entrance gate, Chung Shing Temple, Kang Sam Tong
 Pictures of Wing Lung Wai (personal website)

Walled villages of Hong Kong
Villages in Yuen Long District, Hong Kong
Kam Tin